Abraham J. Pollin (December 3, 1923 – November 24, 2009) was the owner of a number of professional sports teams including the Washington Capitals in the National Hockey League (NHL), the Washington Mystics in the Women's National Basketball Association (WNBA), and the Baltimore / Washington Bullets / Wizards in the National Basketball Association (NBA). Pollin was the longest-tenured owner of an NBA team, holding the Packers / Zephyrs / Bullets / Wizards franchise for 46 years.

Biography
Pollin was born to a Jewish family in Philadelphia on December 3, 1923, to Jennie and Morris Pollin. His family's original surname was Pollinovsky which was shortened to Pollin by Morris upon his arrival at Ellis Island from Russia in 1914. When he was 8, Pollin's family moved to the Washington area from Philadelphia. After graduating from Theodore Roosevelt High School in 1941 and George Washington University with a Bachelor of Business Administration in 1945, he took a job with his family's construction company for 12 years. The Pollins launched their own construction company in 1957.

Pollin was a successful construction contractor in the Washington area. He, along with Earl Foreman and real estate investor/former NBA referee Arnold Heft purchased the then-Baltimore Bullets from Dave Trager for $1.1 million on November 23, 1964. He moved the team to the Washington area in 1973 after building the Capital Centre in suburban Landover, Maryland. In 1996, Pollin announced that he was changing the team's name because he felt the name "Bullets" had too many negative connotations. "Our slogan used to be 'Faster than a speeding bullet,' but that is no longer appropriate", Pollin told the press. A "Name the Team" contest yielded the name "Wizards."

Pollin supported the Washington, D.C. community philanthropically, including a 1988 partnership with businessman Melvin Cohen to award college scholarships to 59 fifth-graders in Seat Pleasant, Maryland. Beginning in 2002, an award called "The Pollin Award" has been awarded annually in his honor. People are chosen for the Pollin Award based on their dedication to the Washington, D.C. community and the impact they have on it. Winners of the award have included Georgia M. Dickens, 2002 Executive Director, The S.T.E.P.U.P. Foundation Of Greater Washington, D.C. Inc., Harvey C. Barnum, Jr., 2005 Teacher of the Year, Jason Kamras and 2006 Miss District of Columbia, Kate Michael.

Death
Pollin died on November 24, 2009, nine days before his 86th birthday, of corticobasal degeneration, a rare brain disease.
He had made donations totaling $3 million toward finding a cure for the disease.

Personal
Pollin and his wife, Irene Sue (née Kerchek) were married on May 27, 1945, in Washington, D.C. The couple had four children, three sons and one daughter: Linda Joy (1947-1963), Robert N. (born 1950), Kenneth Jay (1952-1954), and James Edward (born 1958). Linda and Jay both suffered from congenital heart disease, leading to Jay's death at the age of 14 months old and Linda's death at the age of 16. After Linda's death, her father was so distraught that he quit his construction business and took a year off of work to recuperate from the loss.

Holdings
Abe Pollin was the chairman of the board, chief executive, and the majority shareholder of his company, Washington Sports and Entertainment, which owned the Wizards and the Verizon Center, amongst other entertainment interests. He was also the builder and owner of the Capital Centre, former home of the Washington Bullets (Now Wizards) and Capitals.

Accomplishments and honors
In 1999, Pollin received the Golden Plate Award of the American Academy of Achievement.

On March 9, 2009, Pollin was inducted into the George Washington University School of Business Sports Executives Hall of Fame. In March 2011, he was inducted into the National Jewish Sports Hall of Fame.

Pollin's building and financing of Capital One Arena is often given credit for revitalizing Downtown Washington, D.C. The block of F Street NW where Capital One Arena is located was named "Abe Pollin Way" in his honor. The Irene Apartments at 4701 Willard Ave, Chevy Chase, Maryland, were built by Abe and named after his wife.

Mayor Adrian Fenty named December 3, 2007, "Abe Pollin Day" in Washington, D.C.

References

External links

Wizards profile
AISH profile
Goldstein, Richard "Abe Pollin, Team Owner and Philanthropist, Dies at 85" The New York Times, Wednesday, November 25, 2009

1923 births
2009 deaths
Deaths from corticobasal degeneration
Neurological disease deaths in Washington, D.C.
Businesspeople from Maryland
Businesspeople from Philadelphia
George Washington University alumni
Jewish American sportspeople
National Hockey League executives
Washington Wizards owners
Washington Capitals owners